The Northington-Beach House is a historic mansion in Clarksville, Tennessee, U.S.. It was built in 1886 for Michael C. Northington, a tobacco merchant who served as the mayor or Clarskville from 1906 to 1910. In 1925, it was purchased by Oscar Beach, the founder of the Pan-American Oil Company.

The two-story house was designed in the Italianate architectural style.  A Colonial Revival-style porch was added in 1925. It has been listed on the National Register of Historic Places since July 19, 2001.

References

National Register of Historic Places in Montgomery County, Tennessee
Italianate architecture in Tennessee
Colonial Revival architecture in Tennessee
Houses completed in 1886